The 2013 Italian local elections were held on different dates; most on  26–27 May, with a second round on 9–10 June. In Italy, direct elections were held in 720 municipalities: in each municipality (comune) were chosen mayor and members of the City Council. Of the 720 municipalities, 20 were provincial capitals and only 171 had a population higher than 15,000 inhabitants (10,000 for Sicily).

In Friuli-Venezia Giulia the elections were held on 21–22 April with a second ballot on 5–6 May; all of 13 municipalities of the region voted for a new mayor and a new City Council concurrently with the Regional elections.

In Sicily the elections were held on 9–10 June with a second ballot on 23–24 June.

There weren't provincial elections around Italy because of their abolition (also in Sicily, since 2012), except for Friuli-Venezia Giulia: in this region citizens elected a new president and a new Provincial Council in Province of Udine.

Voting System
All mayoral elections in Italy in cities with a population higher than 15,000 use the same voting system. Under this system voters express a direct choice for the mayor or an indirect choice voting for the party of the candidate's coalition. If no candidate receives at least 50% of votes, the top two candidates go to a second round after two weeks. This gives a result whereby the winning candidate may be able to claim majority support, although it is not guaranteed.

The election of the City Council is based on a direct choice for the candidate with a preference vote: the candidate with the majority of the preferences is elected. The number of the seats for each party is determined proportionally.

Results
Majority of each coalition in 92 municipalities (comuni) with a population higher than 15,000:

Party results
Party votes in 21 provincial capital municipalities:

Mayoral election results

City councils

Notes

2013 elections in Italy
 
 
Municipal elections in Italy
April 2013 events in Italy
May 2013 events in Italy
June 2013 events in Italy